Timothy James Masthay (born March 16, 1987) is a former American football punter. He played college football at Kentucky. Masthay was signed by the Indianapolis Colts as an undrafted free agent in 2009. He has also played for the Green Bay Packers and later won Super Bowl XLV with the Packers over his hometown team, the Pittsburgh Steelers. Masthay was nicknamed "Ginger Wolverine" by his Packers teammates for his long red sideburns.

Masthay joined the Centre Colonels soccer staff as a volunteer assistant coach in the spring of 2018.

Early years
Tim was born to Mark Masthay, who currently serves as the chairman of the chemistry department at the University of Dayton and to Jean Masthay, currently Executive Director of PregnancyCare in Cincinnati, Ohio, and brother of Ted Masthay. Masthay played youth soccer in Des Moines for the Johnston Hornets. Masthay played both football and soccer, as well as baseball and basketball at Murray High School in Murray, Kentucky.  His positions on the school's football team included punter, placekicker, kick returner, wide receiver, and special teams coach.  In the off seasons, he, along with Thomas Morstead, Pat McAfee, T. J. Conley, and Dan Bailey are currently instructors for Kohl's Kicking Camps, a training camp from high school upwards especially for kickers, punters and long snappers.

College career
Masthay played college football for the Kentucky Wildcats football team from 2005 to 2008.

Statistics

Professional career

Indianapolis Colts
After going undrafted in the 2009 NFL Draft, Masthay signed with the Indianapolis Colts. He was released by the Colts on August 11, 2009.

Green Bay Packers
Masthay was signed by the Green Bay Packers to a reserve/future contract on January 15, 2010.

On November 3, 2010, he was named NFC Special Teams Player of the Week.

At the end of the 2010 season, Masthay and the Packers appeared in Super Bowl XLV against the Pittsburgh Steelers. In the 31–25 win, he punted six times for 243 net yards (40.5 average).

During the 2011 NFL season, Masthay set franchise records for gross and net punting averages for a season with a 45.6 gross and 38.6 net yard average.

He threw a 27-yard touchdown to tight end Tom Crabtree off of a fake field goal in a Week 2 game against the Chicago Bears during the 2012 NFL season.

On August 30, 2016, Masthay was released by the Packers.

Statistics
Source: Pro-Football-Reference.com

References

External links
 Green Bay Packers bio 
 Kentucky Wildcats bio
 

1987 births
Living people
Players of American football from Pittsburgh
American football punters
Murray High School (Kentucky) alumni
Kentucky Wildcats football players
Indianapolis Colts players
Green Bay Packers players